Cape Blanco can mean:

Places
Cape Blanco (Oregon), a headland in the U.S. state of Oregon
Ras Nouadhibou, a peninsula on the west coast of Africa

Other uses
Cape Blanco (horse), a Thoroughbred racehorse

See also
 Cape Blanc (disambiguation)
 Cabo Blanco (disambiguation)